Palaeoloxodon cypriotes is an extinct species of dwarf elephant that inhabited the island of Cyprus during the Late Pleistocene. Remains comprise 44 molars, found in the north of the island, seven molars discovered in the south-east, a single measurable femur and a single tusk among very sparse additional bone and tusk fragments. The molars support derivation from the large straight-tusked elephant (Palaeoloxodon antiquus), that inhabited Europe since 780,000 years ago. The species is presumably derived from the older, larger P. xylophagou from the late Middle Pleistocene which reached the island presumably during a Pleistocene glacial maximum when low sea levels allowed a low probability sea crossing between Cyprus and Asia Minor. During subsequent periods of isolation the population adapted within the evolutionary mechanisms of insular dwarfism, which the available sequence of molar fossils confirms to a certain extent. The species became extinct around 12,000 years ago, around the time humans first colonised Cyprus.

Chronology 
The Cyprus dwarf elephant is known from fossils dating from the early Late Pleistocene to earliest Holocene, approximately 11,000 BC. It is suggested that P. cypriotes is descended from Palaeoloxodon xylophagou, a species which is known from a partial skull collected near the village of Xylofagou in SE Cyprus dating to the late Middle Pleistocene (MIS 7, 243-191,000 years ago), which is larger than P. cypriotes, but still much smaller than their mainland ancestor. Both species are considered to have descended from the very large Palaeoloxodon antiquus (straight-tusked elephant) of mainland Europe and the Middle East. It is likely that they arrived in Cyprus by swimming the distance between the Karpas Peninsula and southeastern Anatolia during an episode of low sea level, which even considering additional exposed land area is a minimum of 60 kilometers, further than the known swimming distance record for elephants (48 kilometers). The youngest remains of P. cypriotes date to around 12,000 years before present.

Description 

Palaeoloxodon cypriotes was around 1 metre tall, amongst the smallest known for dwarf elephants alongside the Sicillian Palaeoloxodon falconeri. The estimated body weight of P. cypriotes is only 200 kilogrammes, a weight reduction of 98% from its ancestors which weighed about 10 tonnes. Their molars however were about 40% of the size of the mainland straight-tusked elephants' molars. The size reduction was the result of insular dwarfism, which is likely the result of the reduction in available food, predation and competition.

Paleoecology 
Cyprus exhibited a depauperate fauna during the Late Pleistocene, with the only other large mammal species being the Cyprus dwarf hippopotamus, with the only other terrestrial mammal species being the Cypriot mouse (which is still extant), and a species of genet (Genetta plesictoides).

Excavations 

The first recorded find was by Dorothea Bate in a cave in the Kyrenia hills of Cyprus in 1902, described in a paper for the Royal Society in 1903 and in a later paper for Philosophical Transactions of the Royal Society of London in 1905. The species is also known under its synonym Elephas cypriotes. Finds of whole or partial skeletons of this elephant are very rare, being heavily outnumbered by the Cyprus dwarf hippopotamus.

Notes

References 

 Davies, P., & Lister, A. M., Palaeoloxodon cypriotes, the dwarf elephant of Cyprus: size and scaling comparisons with P. falconeri (Sicily-Malta) and mainland P. antiquus in Cavarretta et al., op. cit. pp. 479–480
 Masseti, M., Did endemic dwarf elephants survive on Mediterranean islands up to protohistorical times? in Cavarretta, Gioia, Mussi & Palombo, La terra degli Elefanti, The World of Elephants (Rome, 2001) pp. 402–406
 Palombo, M. R., Endemic elephants of the Mediterranean Islands: knowledge, problems and perspectives in Cavarretta et al., op. cit.

External links
 Cranial evidence for the presence of a second endemic elephant species on Cyprus

cypriotes
Pleistocene mammals of Europe
Pleistocene proboscideans
Pleistocene first appearances
Holocene extinctions
Prehistoric Cyprus